Kushchino is a rural locality (a selo) and the administrative center of Kushchinskoye Rural Settlement, Alexeyevsky District, Belgorod Oblast, Russia. The population was 569 as of 2010. There are 8 streets.

Geography 
Kushchino is located 15 km south of Alexeyevka (the district's administrative centre) by road. Shcherbakovo is the nearest rural locality.

References 

Rural localities in Alexeyevsky District, Belgorod Oblast
Biryuchensky Uyezd